Mammy Johnsons River, a mostly perennial river of the Mid-Coast Council system, is located in the Mid North Coast and Upper Hunter regions of New South Wales, Australia.

Course and features
Mammy Johnsons River rises on the southwestern slopes of the Great Dividing Range, below Winns Mountain, north northwest of Bulahdelah, and flows generally north, west and south, joined by four tributaries including Wards River, before reaching its confluence with the Karuah River north northwest of Stroud. The river descends  over its  course.

See also

 Rivers of New South Wales
 List of rivers of New South Wales (L–Z)
 List of rivers of Australia

References

External links
 

Rivers of New South Wales
Mid-Coast Council
Rivers of the Hunter Region